Burda is a surname which may refer to the following people:

 Aenne Burda (1909–2005), German publisher, Franz Burda's wife, co-founder of the Burda group
 Franz Burda (1903–1986), German publisher and Nazi Party member, founder of what is now the Hubert Burda Media conglomerate
 Frieder Burda (1936–2019), German art collector, second son of Franz and Aenne
 Hubert Burda (born 1940), owner of Hubert Burda Media, youngest son of Franz and Aenne
 Lyubov Burda (born 1953), Russian retired gymnast
 Michael C. Burda (born 1959), American economist
 Mikołaj Burda (born 1982), Polish Olympic rower

See also
 
 Al-Burda, a poem praising Muhammad
 Brda (disambiguation)